The 50th Academy Awards ceremony, presented by the Academy of Motion Picture Arts and Sciences (AMPAS), honored films released in 1977 and took place on April 3, 1978, at the Dorothy Chandler Pavilion in Los Angeles beginning at 7:00 p.m. PST / 10:00 p.m. EST. During the ceremony, AMPAS presented Academy Awards (commonly referred to as Oscars) in 22 categories. The ceremony, televised in the United States by ABC, was produced by Howard W. Koch and was directed by Marty Pasetta. Actor and comedian Bob Hope hosted for the nineteenth time. He first presided over the 12th ceremony held in 1940 and had last served as a co-host of the 47th ceremony held in 1975. Five days earlier, in a ceremony held at The Beverly Hilton in Beverly Hills, California, on March 29, the Academy Scientific and Technical Awards were presented by hosts Kirk Douglas and Gregory Peck.

Annie Hall won four awards, including Best Picture. Other winners included Star Wars with six awards, Julia with three, and Close Encounters of the Third Kind, The Goodbye Girl, Gravity Is My Enemy, I'll Find a Way, A Little Night Music, Madame Rosa, The Sand Castle, Who Are the DeBolts? And Where Did They Get Nineteen Kids?, and You Light Up My Life with one.

Winners and nominees
The nominees for the 50th Academy Awards were announced on February 21, 1978. Julia and The Turning Point  tied for the most nominations with eleven each. The winners were announced during the awards ceremony on April 3. Woody Allen became the first person to receive nominations for acting, directing, screenwriting for the same film since Orson Welles, who previously achieved this feat for 1941's Citizen Kane. With its 11 nominations and zero wins, The Turning Point became the most nominated film in Oscar history without a win, a record that still stands (tied by The Color Purple in 1985).

This event marked the second time that three films received 10 or more nominations: Julia and The Turning Point both received 11 nominations each, while Star Wars received 10.

Awards

Winners are listed first, highlighted in boldface and indicated with a double dagger.

Academy Honorary Awards
 Margaret Booth

Jean Hersholt Humanitarian Award
 Charlton Heston

Irving G. Thalberg Memorial Award
 Walter Mirisch

Special Achievement Awards
 Ben Burtt for the creation of the alien, creature and robot voices in Star Wars
 Frank Warner for sound effects editing in Close Encounters of the Third Kind

Ceremony
Debby Boone's performance of You Light Up My Life was accompanied by schoolgirls described as "affiliated with the John Tracy Clinic for the Deaf" interpreting the lyrics in sign language. After complaints that their signing was incomprehensible, it was revealed the girls were not deaf and had been taught rudimentary signing specifically for the performance. This prompted protests from the Alliance for Deaf Artists.

Redgrave speech
During the ceremony, Vanessa Redgrave won the Best Supporting Actress award for Julia (1977). Her nomination drew a lot of attention and backlash even prior to the ceremony, as in 1977 she had also produced and appeared in the film The Palestinian, which followed the activities of the Palestine Liberation Organization (PLO) in Lebanon, an organization that at the time was defined as a terrorist organization by Israel due to its responsibility for the deaths of thousands of civilians. The film was criticized by many Jewish groups for its perceived anti-Israel slant, and members of the Jewish Defense League (JDL) picketed Redgrave's nomination outside the Academy Awards ceremony while counter-protestors waved PLO flags. Redgrave won the Oscar and made the following acceptance speech:

Two hours later, when it came his turn to announce the winners for the two Best Screenplay awards, Paddy Chayefsky, perturbed by what he perceived as "cracks about Jews" at the Academy Awards, replied:

Presenters and performers
The following individuals, listed in order of appearance, presented awards or performed musical numbers.

Presenters

Performers

Multiple nominations and awards

These films had multiple nominations:
11 nominations: Julia and The Turning Point
10 nominations: Star Wars
8 nominations: Close Encounters of the Third Kind
5 nominations: Annie Hall and The Goodbye Girl
3 nominations: Equus and The Spy Who Loved Me
2 nominations: Airport '77, A Little Night Music, Looking for Mr. Goodbar, Pete's Dragon, The Slipper and the Rose, A Special Day and That Obscure Object of Desire

The following films received multiple awards.
6 wins: Star Wars (also won a special award)
4 wins: Annie Hall
3 wins: Julia

Tribute
Sammy Davis Jr. and Marvin Hamlisch performed "Come Light the Candles" in tribute to:

 Richard Carlson
 Zero Mostel
 Peter Finch
 Joan Crawford
 Bing Crosby
 Elvis Presley
 Groucho Marx
 Charlie Chaplin

See also
1977 in film
 20th Grammy Awards
 29th Primetime Emmy Awards
 30th Primetime Emmy Awards
 31st British Academy Film Awards
 32nd Tony Awards
 35th Golden Globe Awards

References

External links
 75 Years of Oscar - 1978, E! Online
 Academy Awards, USA: 1978 , IMDb
 filmsite.org: 1977 Academy Awards Winners and History
 Redgrave's 'Zionist Hoodlums' Speech Shocks Hollywood

Academy Awards ceremonies
1977 film awards
1978 in Los Angeles
1978 in American cinema
April 1978 events in the United States
Academy
Television shows directed by Marty Pasetta